The Florida Panthers are a professional ice hockey team based in the Miami metropolitan area. They compete in the National Hockey League (NHL) as a member of the Atlantic Division in the Eastern Conference, and initially played their home games at Miami Arena before moving to the FLA Live Arena in 1998. Located in Sunrise, Florida, the Panthers are the southernmost team in the NHL. The team's local broadcasting rights have been held by Bally Sports Florida (formerly SportsChannel and Fox Sports Florida) since 1996. The Panthers are primarily affiliated with two minor league teams: the Charlotte Checkers of the American Hockey League (AHL) and the Florida Everblades of the ECHL.

The Panthers began playing in the 1993–94 NHL season, where they set the record for the most points by an expansion team in its inaugural season until surpassed by the Vegas Golden Knights in 2017–18. The team has made one appearance in the Stanley Cup Finals in 1996, eventually losing the Finals to the Colorado Avalanche. Since then, the Panthers have only qualified for the Stanley Cup playoffs seven times, not winning a playoff series again until 2022, and have struggled to find sustained success.

History

Early years (1992–2000)
Blockbuster Video magnate Wayne Huizenga was awarded an NHL franchise for Miami on December 10, 1992, the same day The Walt Disney Company earned the rights to start a team in Anaheim that would become the Mighty Ducks. At the time, Huizenga owned both the newly founded Florida Marlins of Major League Baseball and a share of the National Football League (NFL)'s Miami Dolphins. The entry fee was $50 million. Huizenga announced the team would play at the Miami Arena, sharing the building with the National Basketball Association's Miami Heat, until a new arena was built. Offices for the team were only established in June 1993, while vice president of business operations Dean Jordan conceded that "none of the business people, myself included, knew anything about hockey." The new franchise would be the first professional ice hockey team in Miami since the folding of the Tropical Hockey League in 1939.

On April 20, 1993, a press conference in Ft. Lauderdale announced that the team would be named Florida Panthers, with former New York Islanders general manager Bill Torrey as president and Bobby Clarke as general manager. The team is named for the Florida panther, an endangered species of large cat endemic to the nearby Everglades region. Once the logos and uniforms were unveiled on June 15, the team also announced its financial commitment to the panther preservation cause. Huizenga had held the Panthers trademark since 1991, when he purchased it from a group of Tampa investors who sought to create an MLB team in the Tampa Bay area.

The new franchise joined the NHL for participation in the 1993–94 season, along with the Mighty Ducks of Anaheim. The Panthers' and Ducks' rosters were filled in both the expansion draft and the 1993 NHL Entry Draft in June 1993, hosted by Quebec City; that draft produced ten players who would eventually be a part of the 1996 Eastern Conference-winning team.

The Panthers' first major stars were former New York Rangers goaltender John Vanbiesbrouck, rookie Rob Niedermayer and forward Scott Mellanby, who scored 30 goals in Florida's inaugural season. Their first game was a 4–4 tie on the road against the Chicago Blackhawks, while their first win was a 2–0 shutout of the Tampa Bay Lightning in the Thunderdome before a then-NHL record crowd of 27,227. The Panthers had one of the most successful first seasons of any expansion team in league history, finishing just two points below .500 and narrowly missing out on the final 1994 playoff spot in the East. Their first-year success was attributed mainly to the trap defense that first-year coach Roger Neilson implemented. This conservative style was widely criticized by NHL teams; some even suggested that the Panthers were ruining the game. While the team executives expected the audience to consist of mostly "snowbird" Canadians living in Florida, the Floridians soon embraced the Panthers. Helped by Miami's other teams having middling performances, the club averaged 94% capacity at the 14,500-seat Miami Arena, and sold 8,500 season tickets in 100 days.

In August 1994, general manager Clarke left to work for the Philadelphia Flyers; Bryan Murray was brought in from the Detroit Red Wings as his replacement. After another close brush with the playoffs, finishing the lockout-shortened 1994–95 season again in ninth, Neilson was fired following an argument with Murray regarding Ed Jovanovski, whom the Panthers chose as the number one overall pick at the 1994 NHL Entry Draft. Doug MacLean, who had been the team's player development director, was promoted to coach. The team then acquired Ray Sheppard from the San Jose Sharks at the NHL trade deadline and looked toward the playoffs for the first time.

Rat trick and a trip to the Stanley Cup Finals
A very unusual goal celebration developed in Miami during the 1995–96 season. On the night of the Panthers' 1995–96 home opener, a rat scurried across the team's locker room. Scott Mellanby reacted by "one-timing" the rat against the wall, killing it. That night, he scored two goals, which Vanbiesbrouck quipped was "a rat trick." Two nights later, as the story found its way into the world, a few fans threw rubber rats on the ice in celebration of a goal. The rubber rat count went from 16 for the third home game to over 2,000 during the playoffs.

In the 1996 playoffs, as the fourth seed in the East, the Panthers faced the Boston Bruins in the first round and won in five games. Bill Lindsay's series-clinching goal is still a trademark image for the run the third-year franchise went on. The Panthers went on to upset the top-seeded Philadelphia Flyers in six games followed by the second-seeded Pittsburgh Penguins in seven (with Tom Fitzgerald scoring what would end up being the game-winning goal) to reach the Stanley Cup Finals against the Colorado Avalanche, another team making its first Finals appearance. The Avalanche, however, swept the Panthers in four games. Despite losing in the Finals, the Panthers set a record for most wins by an expansion team in their first postseason appearance with 12 victories (this record would later be broken by the Vegas Golden Knights during their inaugural season in 2017–18). For his team's surprising success, Bryan Murray was honored as NHL Executive of the Year.

The Panthers began the next season with a 12–game unbeaten streak, but faded in the second half of the season after trading second line center Stu Barnes. They lost in five games in the first round of the playoffs to the Wayne Gretzky-led New York Rangers. The team would plummet in the 1997–98 season. After a 7–12–4 start, the Panthers fired Doug MacLean, replacing him for the season with general manager Bryan Murray. The change did not aid matters, as Florida posted a franchise-worst 24–43–15 record, including a 15–game winless streak. This season also marked the end of goaltender John Vanbiesbrouck's time in Florida; in the midst of that streak, he was shelled by the Chicago Blackhawks and never played another game for the Panthers. In the following off-season, Vanbiesbrouck signed with the Flyers as a free agent.

New arena and a decade of struggles (1998–2010)
The Panthers moved into the brand new National Car Rental Center (later Office Depot, BankAtlantic Center, and BB&T Center, now known as FLA Live Arena) in 1998. In 1998–99, they acquired Pavel Bure (the "Russian Rocket"), in a blockbuster trade with the Vancouver Canucks. They then reached the playoffs again in 1999–2000, losing in a first-round sweep to the eventual Stanley Cup champion New Jersey Devils. The team slumped in 2000–01. Afterward, Huizenga sold the Panthers to an ownership group led by Alan Cohen. The following season, 2001–02, the Panthers had their worst record ever. Bure struggled despite being reunited with his brother Valeri, and was traded to the Rangers at the 2002 trade deadline.

The Panthers then began eyeing defenceman Jay Bouwmeester, who was widely tipped to be picked first overall pick at the 2002 Draft. However, then-general manager Rick Dudley sent Florida's first pick to the Columbus Blue Jackets, who selected winger Rick Nash, and in return, the Panthers received the right to trade first-round selections with the Blue Jackets in the 2003 Draft, a right which was not exercised when the Panthers received the first overall selection in 2003 as well. The Atlanta Thrashers, after picking goaltender Kari Lehtonen second overall, announced that the Panthers had given them two draft picks to guarantee that Bouwmeester would still be available for Florida's selection. Bouwmeester was selected third overall by the Panthers. Said then-head coach Mike Keenan, "We shouldn't have done that ... Jay would have been number-one if we'd kept that pick."

In 2003, the Panthers hosted the NHL All-Star Weekend in which the Western Conference earned a 6–5 victory after the first overtime shootout in All-Star history. The West overcame a four-goal outburst by Thrashers winger Dany Heatley, who took home MVP honors in his first All-Star appearance.

On June 23, 2006, the Panthers were again involved in a blockbuster trade with Vancouver, sending Roberto Luongo, Lukas Krajicek and a sixth-round draft pick (Sergei Shirokov) in exchange for Todd Bertuzzi, Alex Auld and Bryan Allen. This trade has been regarded by some as one of the worst trades in professional sports history – Luongo, who was at the prime of his career, was one of the League's top goaltenders, while Bertuzzi played just a handful of games for Florida before getting injured. He would later be traded to Detroit Red Wings at the trade deadline for Shawn Matthias. Additionally, Auld ended up a poor replacement for Luongo, and was ultimately let go after one season with the team.

On June 22, 2007, the Panthers were involved in yet another draft-day deal involving a goaltender. The team acquired Tomas Vokoun from the Nashville Predators in exchange for three draft picks – a first-round pick in 2008, a second-round pick in 2008 and a conditional second-round pick that can be used in 2007 or 2008. The move would eventually pay off when Vokoun was selected to the Eastern Conference All-Star Team. On July 28, 2007, Florida unveiled their new jerseys to over 11,000 fans at the BankAtlantic Center during the first intermission of the Panthers' 1996 Reunion game. Star forwards Nathan Horton and Stephen Weiss were both in full gear to help showcase the sweater changes.

In June 2008, the Panthers traded their captain Olli Jokinen to the Phoenix Coyotes for a second-round draft pick and defensemen Keith Ballard and Nick Boynton. The Panthers finished the 2008–09 season with a strong 41–30–11 record and 93 points, their second-highest finish in franchise history. Despite this, however, the Panthers missed the playoffs for an eighth-straight season, the then-longest streak in the NHL.

In November 2009, Cliff Viner and Stu Siegel became the new majority owners. On November 23, 2009, the Panthers made their third jersey, ridding red from the alternate jersey, replacing it with powder blue. The Panthers missed the playoffs for the ninth consecutive time in the 2009–10 season, making them the first team in NHL history to do so in one city.

Dale Tallon era (2010–2020)
Panthers management hired Dale Tallon as the team's new general manager on May 17, 2010. Tallon rebuilt the team with 2010 draft picks Erik Gudbranson, Nick Bjugstad and Quinton Howden, as well as the acquisition of players, including Steve Bernier, Michael Grabner, Marty Reasoner, Ryan Carter and Sergei Samsonov. All of the above-mentioned players, however, were traded at the 2011 trade deadline or released during the 2011 off-season, save for Gudbranson, Bjugstad and Howden. At the end of the 2010–11 season, just Stephen Weiss and David Booth remained from the pre-lockout era Panthers roster.

On June 1, 2011, Kevin Dineen, head coach of the American Hockey League (AHL)'s Portland Pirates, was named to be the 11th head coach of the Panthers. The team also rebranded their image, releasing a new home jersey, predominantly red with navy blue sleeves, and eliminating the navy blue piping on the road jersey; this new  replaced the navy blue one as the main home jersey. The 2011 off-season saw the acquisitions of Scottie Upshall, Tomas Fleischmann, Sean Bergenheim, Marcel Goc, Matt Bradley, Ed Jovanovski, Jose Theodore, Kris Versteeg, Tomas Kopecky and Brian Campbell.

After several more trades and over 300-man-games lost to injury throughout the season, the Panthers were able to finish first in the Southeast Division, marking the end of their record-setting decade-long postseason drought. The Panthers won the first-ever division title in franchise history with a 4–1 victory over the Carolina Hurricanes on April 7, 2012. However, the Panthers were eliminated in the first round of the playoffs by the eventual Eastern Conference champion New Jersey Devils, losing at home in double overtime of Game 7.

In the lockout-shortened 2013 season, the Panthers had an abysmal season. Unable to regain their form from last season, the Panthers suffered key injuries and fell back down into the basement with the worst record in the League. In the 2013–14 season, the Panthers failed to gain any momentum and finished 29th out of 30 teams. The team then fired head coach Kevin Dineen and replaced him with Peter Horachek. At the trade deadline, the Panthers reacquired Roberto Luongo from Vancouver. The Panthers would relieve Horachek of his duties at the end of the season, replacing him with former Columbus Blue Jackets head coach Gerard Gallant. The team also received the first overall pick in the 2014 NHL Entry Draft, using it to select Barrie Colts defenseman Aaron Ekblad.

The Panthers' 2014–15 home opener on October 12, 2014, set a team record for the lowest attendance at a home opener, with only 11,419 spectators in attendance. The team's next game against the Ottawa Senators marked the team's lowest attendance ever, with only 7,311 in attendance. Despite finishing with a record of 38–29–15, the Panthers missed the 2015 playoffs by seven points. On December 8, 2015, the Panthers announced that they signed a 13-year lease, and an $86 million funding agreement with Broward County and would have a new logo and uniforms after the 2015–16 season. Their original logo had remained almost unchanged since their first season in 1993.

In the 2015–16 season, the team set a franchise record with a 12-game win streak. They also set a franchise record for most wins in a regular season with 47 wins and won their division for the second time in their existence. However, the Panthers lost to the New York Islanders in six games in the first round of the playoffs; this would be the first playoff series win for the Islanders since the 1992–93 season. Head coach Gerard Gallant was nominated as a finalist for the Jack Adams Award, which recognizes the NHL Coach of the Year.

The 2016–17 season began with the promotion of general manager Dale Tallon to an executive position within the organization and assistant general manager Tom Rowe was promoted to general manager. After an 11–10–1 start to the season, the Panthers fired head coach Gerard Gallant and general manager Tom Rowe took over as interim head coach. At the end of the season, Rowe was relieved of his duties as both coach and general manager and was named special advisor to Tallon, who returned to positions of team president and general manager. On June 12, 2017, the Panthers named Bob Boughner as their new head coach.

The 2017–18 season began with a 19–22–6 record leading up to the 2018 NHL All-Star Game. The Panthers then went on a 25–8–2 run in their last 35 games, ending up one point short of a playoff berth. Their 44–30–8 record earned 96 regular season points, tying the league record of the 2014–15 Boston Bruins and the 2018–19 Montreal Canadiens for the team with the most regular season points to miss the postseason.

On April 7, 2019, the Panthers fired Boughner after the team failed to qualify for the playoffs for the third straight season. The next day, Joel Quenneville was named the 16th head coach of the Panthers.

On August 10, 2020, after nine years as general manager, the Panthers and Tallon mutually agreed to part ways, following the team's elimination in the 2020 Stanley Cup playoffs. In Tallon's tenure, the Panthers qualified for the Stanley Cup Playoffs three times, in 2012, 2016, and 2020.

Arrival of Bill Zito, return to dominance (2020–present)
Panthers management hired Bill Zito to succeed Tallon as the team's general manager on September 2, 2020. During the shortened 2020–21 NHL season, the Panthers compiled 79 points in 56 games played, finishing the season in second place in the Atlantic Division, one point behind the Carolina Hurricanes. As such, they were pitted against division and statewide rival, the Tampa Bay Lightning, in the first round of the playoffs. They were defeated in 6 games to the eventual Stanley Cup champions, for yet another 1st round exit.

In the 2021–22 season, Quenneville led the Panthers to a 7–0–0 record through the team's first seven games, but he would resign from his coaching duties as a result of the fallout from the 2010 Chicago Blackhawks sexual assault scandal on October 28, 2021. The next day, the Panthers named former NHL player Andrew Brunette their interim head coach. On April 3, 2022, the Panthers became the first team during the 2021–22 season to clinch a postseason berth, when they defeated the Buffalo Sabres at home, 5–3. This victory was also Florida's 48th of the season, breaking their previous record set during 2015–16 NHL season. Three weeks later, on April 21, 2022, following a 5–2 victory over the Detroit Red Wings, the Panthers crowned themselves as Atlantic Division champions for the first time since the 2015–16 season. The victory was also Florida's 12th consecutive, dating all the way back to a 7–4 win over the Montreal Canadiens on March 29. This win streak matched another one achieved during the 2015–16 season, tying the franchise record. With the win, the Panthers improved to a stellar 56–15–6 record, tallying 118 points, and overcoming the Colorado Avalanche in the quest for the Presidents' Trophy. After an Avalanche defeat, and a Panthers 4–0 victory over the Ottawa Senators on April 28, the Panthers clinched the Presidents' Trophy for the first time in franchise history. They would end the regular season with 122 points, with a 58–18–6 record, the best record registered in the league since division rivals Tampa Bay Lightning in 2018–19. On May 13, the Panthers advanced past the first round for the first time in 26 years, dating all the way back to the 1996 Eastern Conference Finals, by beating the Washington Capitals in six games, eliminating them with a 4–3 overtime victory. However, their luck would run out in the Second Round, as the Panthers were swept in four games by the archrival the Tampa Bay Lightning. Florida went completely dry offensively, scoring only three goals throughout the whole four-game series.

Logo and uniforms
The Florida Panthers have had just two primary logos over the course of their history. Their first logo, used from 1993 to 2016, depicted a leaping panther. Other logos from the era included an alternate version of the "leaping panther" logo, this time holding a pair of broken hockey sticks, and a logo depicting a yellow sun behind a hockey stick and a palm tree. The "leaping panther" logo was redesigned and relegated to an alternate logo when the Panthers unveiled a new logo in the 2016–17 season. The current primary logo is a shield with the profile of a panther head below the word "Florida"; the same logo with the word "Panthers" above is also used interchangeably.

The Panthers' first uniform set was used from 1993 to 2007. The red road and white home uniforms featured the leaping panther crest in front and the alternate palm tree logo on the shoulders. Diagonal stripes accentuated the sleeves and the yoke design was triangular in shape. Yellow and navy were used as accent colors.

In 1998, the Panthers debuted an alternate navy uniform, with the front crest depicting the leaping panther holding a pair of broken hockey sticks. Prior to the 2003–04 season, the navy uniform became the primary home uniform while the red uniform was relegated to alternate status. The crests on both uniforms were also switched.

Adopting the Reebok Edge template in 2007, the Panthers revealed new uniform designs. The navy and white uniforms sported a thicker stripe on each sleeve along with added piping.

In 2009, the Panthers unveiled a navy alternate uniform, featuring a roundel crest depicting a panther head surrounded by the team name. Powder blue replaced red as trim color and the alternate "FLA" sunshine logo was placed on the shoulders. This uniform was used for three seasons.

Before the 2011–12 season, the Panthers retired their primary navy uniforms and returned to wearing red uniforms at home. The piping on the chest was also eliminated.

The Panthers overhauled their visual design prior to the 2016–17 season, replacing yellow with flat gold as trim color. Red uniforms featured the shield logo with the team name, while the white uniforms used the variation with the city name. An alternate logo featuring the flag of Florida below a crawling panther is added on the sleeves. Both sets feature thick contrasting stripes on the chest and sleeves. The basic design was retained once Adidas took over as supplier prior to the 2017–18 season.

For the 2020–21 season, the Panthers released a "Reverse Retro" alternate uniform, essentially a recoloring of the team's original uniform. In this case, the Panthers wore their original 1990s "leaping panther" uniform, but with a navy base and flat gold replacing yellow as a trim color. A second "Reverse Retro" uniform was unveiled, again using the same 1990s-era template but with a powder blue base (a nod to the 2009–12 navy alternates) and the alternate palm tree, sun and stick logo in front.

Season-by-season record
This is a partial list of the last five seasons completed by the Panthers. For the full season-by-season history, see List of Florida Panthers seasons.

Note: GP = Games played, W = Wins, L = Losses, T = Ties, OTL = Overtime Losses, Pts = Points, GF = Goals for, GA = Goals against

Players

Current roster

Team captains

 Brian Skrudland, 1993–1997
 Scott Mellanby, 1997–2001
 Pavel Bure & Paul Laus, 2001–2002 
 Olli Jokinen, 2003–2008
 Bryan McCabe, 2009–2011
 Ed Jovanovski, 2013–2014
 Willie Mitchell, 2014–2016
 Derek MacKenzie, 2016–2018
 Aleksander Barkov, 2018–present

League and team honors

Awards and trophies

Prince of Wales Trophy
 1995–96
Maurice "Rocket" Richard Trophy
 Pavel Bure: 1999–2000, 2000–01

Lady Byng Memorial Trophy
 Brian Campbell: 2011–12
 Aleksander Barkov: 2018–19
Calder Memorial Trophy
 Jonathan Huberdeau: 2012–13
 Aaron Ekblad: 2014–15

Bill Masterton Memorial Trophy
 Jaromir Jagr: 2015–16

Frank J. Selke Trophy
 Aleksander Barkov: 2020–21
Presidents' Trophy
 2021–22

First-round draft picks

 1993: Rob Niedermayer (5th overall)
 1994: Ed Jovanovski (1st overall)
 1995: Radek Dvorak (10th overall)
 1996: Marcus Nilson (20th overall)
 1997: Mike Brown (20th overall)
 1998: None
 1999: Denis Shvidki (12th overall)
 2000: None
 2001: Stephen Weiss (4th overall) & Lukas Krajicek (24th overall)
 2002: Jay Bouwmeester (3rd overall) & Petr Taticek (9th overall)
 2003: Nathan Horton (3rd overall) & Anthony Stewart (25th overall)
 2004: Rostislav Olesz (7th overall)
 2005: Kenndal McArdle (20th overall)
 2006: Michael Frolik (10th overall)
 2007: Keaton Ellerby (10th overall)
 2008: None
 2009: Dmitri Kulikov (14th overall)
 2010: Erik Gudbranson (3rd overall), Nick Bjugstad (19th overall) & Quinton Howden (25th overall)
 2011: Jonathan Huberdeau (3rd overall)
 2012: Mike Matheson (23rd overall)
 2013: Aleksander Barkov (2nd overall)
 2014: Aaron Ekblad (1st overall)
 2015: Lawson Crouse (11th overall)
 2016: Henrik Borgstrom (23rd overall)
 2017: Owen Tippett (10th overall)
 2018: Grigori Denisenko (15th overall)
 2019: Spencer Knight (13th overall)
 2020: Anton Lundell (12th overall)
 2021: Mackie Samoskevich (24th overall)
 2022: None

Hockey Hall of Fame inductees
The Florida Panthers have an affiliation with a number of inductees to the Hockey Hall of Fame. Inductees affiliated with the Panthers include six former players and two builders of the sport. Builders that have an affiliation with the Panthers include former head coach Roger Nielson, and Bill Torrey, former general manager of the Panthers. Former play-by-play commentator, Dave Strader was also a recipient of the Foster Hewitt Memorial Award from the Hockey Hall of Fame, for his contributions in hockey broadcasting.

NHL All-Star Game selections
Players

 1994: Bob Kudelski, John Vanbiesbrouck
 1996: Scott Mellanby, John Vanbiesbrouck
 1997: Robert Svehla, John Vanbiesbrouck
 2000: Pavel Bure, Viktor Kozlov, Ray Whitney
 2001: Pavel Bure 
 2002: Sandis Ozolinsh
 2003: Olli Jokinen, Sandis Ozolinsh
 2004: Roberto Luongo
 2007: Jay Bouwmeester
 2008: Tomas Vokoun
 2009: Jay Bouwmeester
 2012: Brian Campbell
 2015: Aaron Ekblad, Roberto Luongo
 2016: Aaron Ekblad, Jaromir Jagr, Roberto Luongo
 2017: Vincent Trocheck
 2018: Aleksander Barkov
 2019: Keith Yandle
 2020: Jonathan Huberdeau
 2022: Jonathan Huberdeau
 2023: Matthew Tkachuk, Aleksander Barkov

Head coaches
 Doug MacLean, 1996, 1997
 Gerard Gallant, 2016
 Andrew Brunette, 2022

Retired numbers

The NHL retired Wayne Gretzky's No. 99 for all its member teams at the 2000 NHL All-Star Game.

Franchise scoring leaders
These are the top-ten-point-scorers in franchise history. Figures are updated after each completed NHL regular season.
  – current Panthers player
Note: Pos = Position; GP = Games Played; G = Goals; A = Assists; Pts = Points; P/G = Points per game

Franchise individual records

 Most goals in a season: Pavel Bure, 59 (2000–01)
 Most assists in a season: Jonathan Huberdeau, 85 (2021–22)
 Most points in a season: Jonathan Huberdeau, 115 (2021–22)
 Most penalty minutes in a season: Peter Worrell, 354 (2001–02)
 Most points in a season, defenseman: Keith Yandle, 62 (2018–19)
 Most points in a season, rookie: Jesse Belanger, 50 (1993–94)
 Highest +/- in a season: Gustav Forsling, +41 (2021–22)
 Most wins in a season: Sergei Bobrovsky, 39 (2021–22)
 Most saves in a shutout win: Craig Anderson, 53
 Most shutouts in a season: Roberto Luongo (2003–04), Tomas Vokoun (2009–10), 7
 All-time leader in goals against average: Tomas Vokoun, 2.57
 All-time leader in shutouts: Roberto Luongo, 38
 All-time leader in games played by a goaltender: Roberto Luongo, 572
 All-time leader in wins by a goaltender: Roberto Luongo, 230

Other honors
Featured EA Sports NHL 97 cover athlete: John Vanbiesbrouck.

See also
 List of Florida Panthers general managers
 List of Florida Panthers head coaches
 List of Florida Panthers players

References

External links

 

 
National Hockey League teams
1993 establishments in Florida
Atlantic Division (NHL)
Panthers
Ice hockey clubs established in 1993
Ice hockey teams in Miami